The 2023 New Brunswick Tankard, the provincial men's curling championship for New Brunswick, was held from February 8 to 12 at Curl Moncton in Moncton, New Brunswick. The winning Scott Jones rink represented New Brunswick at the 2023 Tim Hortons Brier in London, Ontario where they finished last in Pool B with a 1–7 record.

The event reverted back to the previous format after the previous years event.

Qualification process

Teams
The teams are listed as follows:

Round robin standings
Final Round Robin standings

Round Robin results
All draw times listed in Atlantic Time (UTC−04:00).

Draw 1
Wednesday, February 8, 1:30 pm

Draw 2
Wednesday, February 8, 7:30 pm

Draw 3
Thursday, February 9, 1:00 pm

Draw 4
Thursday, February 9, 7:00 pm

Draw 5
Friday, February 10, 2:00 pm

Draw 6
Friday, February 10, 7:00 pm

Draw 7
Saturday, February 11, 9:00 am

Playoffs

Semifinal
Saturday, February 11, 7:00 pm

Final
Sunday, February 12, 2:00 PM

References

2023 Tim Hortons Brier
Curling competitions in Moncton
2023 in New Brunswick
New Brunswick Tankard